Year 1174 (MCLXXIV) was a common year starting on Tuesday (link will display the full calendar) of the Julian calendar, the 1174th year of the Common Era (CE) and Anno Domini (AD) designations, the 174th year of the 2nd millennium, the 74th year of the 12th century, and the 5th year of the 1170s decade.

Events 
 By place 

 England 
 July 13 – Battle of Alnwick: King William I (the Lion) supported by Flemish mercenaries invades England to help fight in the baronial rebellion against King Henry II. William attacks Prudhoe Castle in Northumberland, but is unable to capture it. He is captured by Lord Ranulf de Glanvill and brought back to Newcastle. Henry occupies a part of Scotland, with its five strongest castles: Roxburgh, Berwick, Jedburgh, Edinburgh and Stirling.
 September 5 – Canterbury Cathedral is severely damaged in a fire.
 September 30 – The Revolt of 1173–1174: After a year and a half of rebellion, Henry II achieves peace agreements with his sons Henry the Young King, Richard, Geoffrey and John at Montlouis, on the basis of the pre-war status quo. Before he returns to Normandy, Henry orders the rebel castles in England and Aquitaine to be destroyed.
 October – Battle of Thurles: Gaelic-Irish forces under King Domnall Mór Ua Briain defeat an Anglo-Norman invasion at Thurles in Ireland. The English expedition led by Earl Richard de Clare (Strongbow) is surprised while encamped in the area of Lognafola and is forced to retreat to Waterford.
 December 8 – The Treaty of Falaise: Captured by the English, William I is forced to sign a peace agreement. The treaty makes Scotland a feudal possession of England, William and his nobles swear allegiance to Henry II. He must hand over several castles to Henry in return for his freedom.

 Europe 
 Summer – French forces under King Louis VII, supported by Henry the Young King and Philip of Alsace, encircle Rouen. The city holds out against the war engines long enough for Henry II to arrive in the middle of August to stage a rescue. The besiegers are fearful that Henry will invade France and the siege is lifted.
 October 29 – Emperor Frederick I (Barbarossa), on his fifth Italian campaign, begins the siege of Alessandria in northern Italy. He is opposed by the Lombard League (now joined by Venice, Sicily and Constantinople).

 Levant 
 May 15 – Nur al-Din, Seljuk ruler (atabeg) of Syria, dies at Damascus after a 28-year reign. He is succeeded by his 11-year-old son As-Salih Ismail al-Malik. Meanwhile,  Saladin declares himself his regent and vassal.
 July 11 – King Amalric I dies of dysentery after an 11-year reign. He is succeeded by his 13-year-old son Baldwin IV (the Leper), who becomes ruler of Jerusalem. Count Raymond of Tripoli is appointed as his regent.
 November 23 – Saladin arrives at Damascus and spends the night at his father's old house, until the gates of the Citadel of Damascus, are opened to him, after a brief siege by his brother Tughtakin ibn Ayyub.

 Egypt 
 July 25 – The Sicilian fleet (some 250 ships) under Admiral Tancred launches a failed attack against Alexandria. But he is deprived of support and forced to sail away after a seven-day blockade on August 1.
 Saladin sends his brother Turan-Shah with an army and supporting fleet to conquer Yemen. This to consolidate Muslim control over the Red Sea while protecting the pilgrimage route from Egypt to Mecca.

 Asia 
 Kilij Arslan II, Seljuk ruler of the Sultanate of Rum, rounds off his conquest of the Danishmend Turks in Eastern Anatolia. He allies with the Zangid rulers against Mosul.

 By topic 

 Religion 
 April 7 – Pope Alexander III consecrates Richard of Dover as archbishop of Canterbury at Anagni. Richard returns to England bearing his pallium which he has received directly from the pope.
 July 7 – Henry II does penance at Canterbury for the murder of Thomas Becket (see 1170), even though indirect. He is whipped by the monks as punishment.

Births 
 Edmund of Abingdon, English archbishop (d. 1240)
 Emeric, king of Hungary and  Croatia (d. 1204)
 Gerard of Villamagna, Italian hermit (d. 1242)
 Hedwig of Silesia, duchess of Greater Poland (d. 1243)
 Ingeborg of Denmark, queen of France (d. 1237)
 Liu Songnian, Chinese landscape painter (d. 1224)
 Robert de Gresle, English landowner (d. 1230)
 Sava (the Enlightener), Serbian prince (d. 1236)

Deaths 
 January 18 – Vladislaus II, duke of Bohemia (b. 1110)
 May 15 – Nur al-Din, Seljuk ruler of Syria (b. 1118)
 June 28 – Andrei Bogolyubsky, prince of Vladimir 
 July 11 – Amalric I, king of Jerusalem (b. 1136)
 September 17 – Pietro di Miso, Italian cardinal
 September 22 – Uhtred, Lord of Galloway 
 Ananda Thuriya, Burmese minister and poet
 Arnau Mir (or Arnal), count of Pallars Jussà
 Enguerrand (or Ingram), bishop of Glasgow
 Everard des Barres, French Grand Master
 Gilla Mo Chaidbeo, Irish monk and abbot
 Miles of Plancy (or Milo), French nobleman
 Mu'ayyid al-Din Ai-Aba, ruler of Nishapur
 Peter II of Tarentaise, French bishop (b. 1102)
 Shin Panthagu, Burmese monk (b. 1083)
 Walter of Mortagne, French philosopher
 Walter of Saint Omer, prince of Galilee
 William de Chesney, English nobleman
 William de Turbeville, English bishop

References